List of communities in Queens County, Nova Scotia

Communities are ordered by the highway upon which they are located.  All routes start with the terminus located near the largest community.

Trunk routes
Trunk 3: Brooklyn - Liverpool - White Point - Hunt's Point - Summerville Centre - Summerville Beach
Trunk 8: Liverpool - Milton - Middlefield - Pleasantfield - South Brookfield - Caledonia - Harmony Mills - Kempt

Collector roads
Route 208: South Brookfield- North Brookfield- Brookfield Mines - Pleasant River
Route 210: Greenfield - Buckfield
Route 331: East Port Medway

Communities located on rural roads

Bang's Falls
Beach Meadows
Beech Hill
Bristol
Charleston
East Berlin
Eagle Head
East Side Port l'Hébert
Hibernia
Labelle
Low Landing
Medway
Mill Village
Molega
Mount Pleasant
New Grafton
Northfield
Port Joli
Port Medway
Riversdale
Sandy Cove
South West Port Mouton
Wellington
West Berlin
West Caledonia
Western Head
Westfield
Whiteburn Mines

See also

Hants County